The 1998 Tippeligaen was the 54th completed season of top division football in Norway. Each team played 26 games with 3 points given for wins and 1 for draws. Number thirteen and fourteen are relegated, number twelve has to play two qualification matches (home and away) against number three in the first division (where number one and two are directly promoted) for the last spot.

Teams and locations
''Note: Table lists in alphabetical order.

League table

Relegation play-offs
Kongsvinger won the play-offs against Kjelsås 7–2 on aggregate.

Results

Season statistics

Top scorers

Attendances

References 

Eliteserien seasons
Norway
Norway
1